The list of ship commissionings in 1894 includes a chronological list of all ships commissioned in 1894.


See also 

1894
 Ship commissionings